David Sherer (born 1957), is an American physician and author. He is the lead author of Dr. David Sherer's Hospital Survival Guide: 100+ Ways to Make Your Hospital Stay Safe and Comfortable.
Sherer wrote the monthly blog "What Your Doctor Isn't Telling You" for Bottom Line, Inc. of Stamford, Connecticut. He also appeared in videos produced by that company on a variety of health, medical and healthcare topics. 
His latest non-fiction book was released by Humanix on July 21, 2020. This book is an updated and expanded edition of his 2003 hospital book and is entitled "The Hospital Survival Guide". In 2021, Sherer released two more books, "What your doctor won't tell you" and his debut novel "Into the Ether".

Biography
He has a BA in music from Emory University (1979). He graduated from Boston University School of Medicine in 1984 and completed his anesthesiology residency at the University of Miami Jackson Memorial Hospital in 1989. He was certified by The American Board of Anesthesiology in 1991.

Sherer practiced anesthesiology in the suburbs of Washington, D.C., until his retirement from clinical medicine in 2019. He now heads Consolidated Medicine, a medical practice and consulting group headquartered in Chevy Chase, Maryland, that consists of four divisions: clinical, literary, medico-legal and financial consulting.

Beginning in July, 2022, his new quarterly column "Wake Up Call" will appear in "Anesthesiology News".

References 

https://bottomlineinc.com/source/david-sherer

1957 births
Living people
American anesthesiologists
People from Washington, D.C.
Boston University School of Medicine alumni
Emory University alumni